Somerton is a civil parish in the English county of Norfolk.

For the purposes of local government, the parish falls within the district of Great Yarmouth.

The church of West Somerton St Mary is one of 124 existing round-tower churches in Norfolk.

Notable residents
In the churchyard is the grave of Robert Hales, the Norfolk Giant. He was born in the village in 1820 and one of nine children. As his health worsened he returned to Norfolk, where he died in 1863.

Notes

External links

 for East Somerton.
 for West Somerton.
St Mary's on the European Round Tower Churches website

Civil parishes in Norfolk
Borough of Great Yarmouth